Kim Eun-kyung (born 9 June 1956) is a South Korean politician who served as President Moon Jae-in's first Minister of Environment. She was later jailed for two years and sixth months for abuse of power during her term as environment minister.

Career
Kim was previously widely known to the public as "Ms. Phenol" due to her activism as a citizen representative during 1991 Nakdong River phenol contamination incident.

She first started public service in 1995 when she was elected as Nowon District Council member. On 1998, she was elected as a Seoul Metropolitan Council member. After losing her re-election in 2002, she joined then-candidate Roh Moo-hyun's presidential campaign as his special advisor on environment. She continued working with Roh at his transition team and Blue House until the end of his presidency in 2006.

Kim served as the environment minister from July 2017 to November 2018. In January 2018, the Environment Ministry created a blacklist of 24 public servants associated with the previous Park Geun-hye administration. Kim pressured 15 executives of state-run companies to step down and be replaced by loyalists to the Moon administration. 13 of 24 individuals on the list resigned due to government pressure.

On February 9, 2021, the Seoul Central District Court sentenced Kim Eun-kyung to 2 years and six months of prison for the environment ministry blacklist case. The court also ordered her to be immediately jailed to prevent the possible destruction of evidence.

Education
She holds three degrees - a bachelor and doctorate in management from Korea University and a master's in urban administration from University of Seoul.

Awards 
  Order of Service Merit by the government of South Korea (2005)

References 

Living people
1956 births
South Korean politicians convicted of crimes
Korea University alumni
University of Seoul alumni
People from Seoul
Women government ministers of South Korea
Environment ministers of South Korea